The State Bank of Vietnam is the central bank of Vietnam. It currently holds an about 65% stake of VietinBank - the country's largest listed bank by capital.

History

When Indochina was under French rule, the colonial government governed the Indochinese monetary system through Banque de l'Indochine, which also acted as a commercial bank in French Indochina. 

After the August Revolution in 1945, the government of the Democratic Republic of Vietnam gradually attempted to exercise a monetary system independent from France. On 6 May 1951, president Hồ Chí Minh signed decree 15/SL on establishment of National Bank of Vietnam (Ngân hàng Quốc gia Việt Nam). On 21 January 1960, the governor of the bank signed an ordinance on behalf of the prime minister to rename the bank State Bank of Vietnam (Ngân hàng Nhà nước Việt Nam).

After the fall of Saigon, the two Vietnams were united but not until July 1976 did the two countries’ administrations and institutions unite. In July 1976, the National Bank of Vietnam (the central bank of Republic of Vietnam) was merged into the State Bank of Vietnam. 

In the Doi moi liberalisation era, the banking system of Vietnam was reformed. New banks were created, starting with the Industrial and Commercial Bank of Vietnam (VietinBank - now the largest listed bank) and the Vietnam Bank for Agriculture in 1988, and the role of the State Bank was gradually narrowed to that of a central bank. In 1990, an ordinance reorganised the state bank and redefined its function as: "on behalf of the State, of managing money, credit, and banking operations throughout the country in order to stabilize a value of money, and is the only agency with power to circulate the currency of the Socialist Republic of Vietnam" While the State Bank continued to lend to state-owned enterprises in the following years, it has now been largely superseded in the respect by other state-owned banks and by private banks.

Buildings

Several of the State Bank of Vietnam’s buildings are inherited from the Banque de l'Indochine. These include the State Bank’s headquarters in Hanoi, former Hanoi office completed in 1930; the Ho Chi Minh City branch, former central office in Indochina, also completed in 1930; and the branches in Haiphong (completed in 1925) and Nam Định (completed in 1929) among others.

Controversies
The former prime minister, Nguyễn Tấn Dũng, was a governor while he held the post of senior deputy prime minister, but later bestowed the governor's post upon Le Duc Thuy. There has been criticism of the printing quality of the new polymer đồng banknotes. Controversy also surrounded the purchase of the state house by governor Le Duc Thuy when he bought a house belonging to the bank one tenth of the market value. However, the government stopped the deal when the media reported the purchase.

Functions and roles
The State Bank of Vietnam is a ministry-level body under the administration of the government; the bank governor is a member of the cabinet (equivalent to a minister in the cabinet). The governor is nominated by the prime minister subject to the approval of the National Assembly (Parliament).  Vice governors are appointed by the prime minister on the recommendation of the governor. Both governor and vice governors serve a 5-year term. The State Bank of Vietnam defines its principal roles as :
 Promote monetary stability and formulate monetary policies.
 Promote institutions’ stability and supervise financial institutions.
 Provide banking facilities and recommend economic policies to the government. 
 Provide banking facilities for the financial institutions.
 Manage the country's international reserves.
 Print and issue banknotes.
 Supervise all commercial banks’ activities in Vietnam. Lend the state money to the commercial banks.
 Issue government bonds, organise bond auctions.
 Be in charge of other roles in monetary management and foreign exchange rates

Governor of the State Bank of Vietnam

See also
 List of banks in Vietnam
 Economy of Vietnam
 Vietnamese đồng

References

External links
  State Bank of Vietnam official website

Banks of Vietnam
Vietnam
Government of Vietnam
Banks established in 1951
Vietnamese companies established in 1951